Ross McLaren (born 24 October 1991) is an English actor. McLaren began his career performing in various stage productions, including Big the Musical and Guys and Dolls. Then in 2021, he was cast in the role of Luca McIntyre on the BBC soap opera Doctors. For his role as Luca, he has been nominated at award ceremonies including the National Television Awards, the RTS Midlands Awards and the British Soap Awards. In 2022, McLaren took a break from the soap to appear in a touring production of Singin' in the Rain.

Life and career
McLaren was born on 24 October 1991 in Scunthorpe, North Lincolnshire. McLaren studied at the Joyce Mason School of Dance, as well as the Millennium Theatre Arts School. After graduating, he appeared in 42nd Street at the Curve in Leicester. He then appeared in a touring production of Annie through New Zealand, and starred in a production of Singin' in the Rain at the Théâtre du Châtelet in Paris, in the role of Sid Phillips. In February 2021, it was announced that he had joined the regular cast of the BBC daytime soap opera Doctors as nurse Luca McIntyre. His debut appearance aired on 24 February 2021. For his portrayal of the role, he was longlisted for the Newcomer award at the 26th National Television Awards, as well as being nominated for the British Soap Award for Best Newcomer. In 2022, he starred in a touring production of Singin' in the Rain, this time in the role of Cosmo Brown. He took a break from his role in Doctors to appear in the tour, with his management confirming that he would reprise his role as Luca following the completion of the tour.

Stage

Filmography

Awards and nominations

References

External links
 

1991 births
English male musical theatre actors
English male soap opera actors
English male stage actors
Living people
Male actors from Lincolnshire
People educated at Joyce Mason School of Dance
People from Scunthorpe